Katúň is a small settlement close to Spišské Podhradie, Slovakia (48° 59' N, 20° 44' E).

The settlement contains an ancient bell tower, supposed to have originated in the 12th century, which is a Slovak national monument.

Spiš
Christian bell towers